Sphallenum tuberosum is a species of beetle in the family Cerambycidae, the only species in the genus Sphallenum.

References

Cerambycini